My Perfect Landing is a Canadian pre-teen drama series. It follows a family of gymnasts through their struggles of dealing with a life-changing move from Miami to Toronto, Canada. The series was created by Frank van Keeken, the creator of The Next Step and Lost and Found Music Studios. The series premiered on Family Channel on January 8, 2020, airing 15 episodes through April 22, 2020. It aired on CBBC in the United Kingdom, and was released internationally on Netflix on August 1, 2020.

Cast
 Morgan Wigle as Jenny Cortez
 Tom Hulshof as Joon Cortez
 Helena Marie as Whitney Cortez
 Shawn Thompson as Gus McIlroy
 Natasha Zaborski as Olivia Shaw
 Hailey Vynychenko as Sarah Cortez
 Ajanae Stephenson as Keisha Armstrong
 Francesca van Keeken as Rachel Osbourne
 Holly Belbeck as Cassie LaVoisier
 Leonidas Castrounis as Kiko LaVoisier
 Keira Still as Josephine "Bops" Percival
 Luca Assad as Lena Montgomery
 Abby Stretch as Tori Bannister
 Osias Reid as Dace Deloreon
 Azeem Nathoo as Mo
 Jordan Clark as Miss Allister
 Frank Van Keeken as the bus driver
 Nicholas Maiorano as Hillside employee
 Anna Beauchamp as Dancer 1

Episodes

References

External links

 
 

Family Channel (Canadian TV network) original programming
2020s Canadian comedy-drama television series
2020 Canadian television series debuts
English-language television shows
2020s Canadian teen drama television series
Television series about children
Television shows set in Toronto
Gymnastics mass media